The Bordoloi Trophy, also known as the Bharat Ratna Lokopriya Gopinath Bordoloi Trophy, is a premier annual Indian football tournament held in Guwahati and organized by Guwahati Sports Association (GSA). The tournament was first started in 1952 and is named after Assam's first chief minister Gopinath Bordoloi. Apart from some top clubs from India, clubs from Nepal, Bangladesh and Thailand have also participated in this championship. Abahani Limited of Bangladesh lifted the 2010 trophy.

Mohun Bagan AC of Kolkata has won the tournament for record seven times.

Guwahati Sports Association had announced that the 68th edition of the Bordoloi Trophy is going to be held from March 24, 2022. Delhi FC won their 1st title of the tournament by defeating Nagaland Police in the final clash.

Venues
The matches of the tournament are usually played at Nehru Stadium, Guwahati. From the last few seasons, Judges Field as well as some other nearby venues have also hosted the matches along with Nehru Stadium.

Results

See also
I-League
Assam State Premier League
Assam Football Association
All India Football Federation
ATPA Shield
Bodousa Cup

References

External links
Bordoloi Trophy on Facebook

Bordoloi Trophy
Football in Assam
Football cup competitions in India
1952 establishments in India
Recurring sporting events established in 1952